Scott Evans (born July 27, 1981 in Peterborough, Ontario) is a lacrosse who most recently played for the Edmonton Rush in the National Lacrosse League. Evans also plays for the Peterborough Lakers of Major Series Lacrosse (MSL) in the summer, and won the Mann Cup with the Lakers in both 2004 and 2006.

Professional career
In 2003, Evans was drafted by the Rochester Knighthawks in the first round, fifth overall. During the 2004 NLL season, Evans was selected to the NLL All-Rookie team and was named rookie of the week twice.

On December 16, it was announced that Evans will miss the entire 2009 season with a torn ACL.

Statistics

NLL
Reference:

References

External links
 Bio at Rochester Knighthawks web site
 

1981 births
Living people
Canadian expatriate lacrosse people in the United States
Canadian lacrosse players
Edmonton Rush players
Lacrosse forwards
Lacrosse people from Ontario
National Lacrosse League All-Stars
Rochester Knighthawks players
Sportspeople from Peterborough, Ontario